The Pretenders is a 1981 Dutch drama film directed by Jos Stelling. It was entered into the 12th Moscow International Film Festival.

Cast
 Evert Holtzer as Evert
 Coby Stunnenberg as Greet
 Ad Rietveld as Adje
 Corina Singeling as Bep
 Ton van Dort as Herman
 Peter van Laar as Peter
 Bob Casandra as Bob
 Simone Dresens as Truus
 Henk Fakkeldij as Henk

References

External links
 

1981 films
1981 drama films
Dutch drama films
1980s Dutch-language films
Films directed by Jos Stelling